Riverina Theatre Company (also known as the RTC) was established in 1976 as the Riverina Trucking Company however changed its name to the Riverina Theatre Company in 1983. It was the longest serving theatre company in Regional Australia.

In 2005 Riverina Theatre Company lost $150,000 in funding from The Australia Council after the Council's director of theatre found that the application for funding wasn't strong enough.

Charles Sturt University took over ownership of the after the theatre company which was $90,000 in debt and also lost $300,000 in State and Federal Government funding for its operation.

Closure
On 17 March 2009, the board members of the Riverina Theatre Company decided to place the RTC into liquidation after the RTC lost government grants of up to A$300,000 and the failure of last two productions to being in income.

References and notes

External links
Riverina Theatre Company website

Theatre companies in Australia
History of Wagga Wagga